The Institute of Information Technology Advancement (IITA) is a South Korea government organization under the National IT Industry Promotion Agency (NIPA), working in the fields of research and development (R&D) and information technology (IT).

Many IT-projects in Korea are funded by the IITA.

IITA Scholarship
IITA also offers the Korean government's "IITA Scholarship Program" to qualified international graduate students enrolled in Korean universities in majors such as IT, computer engineering, computer science, electronics and related fields. Applications are possible twice a year (in spring and fall). Those already enrolled in a Korean university must have an academic advisor. All applications must be made through the participating schools on behalf of the students. The scholarships cover tuition fees and all other expenses for two years (masters) or four years (for a PhD degree).

External links
Official NIPA website
Official website for Scholarship
National Institute for International Education Development (English website)

Student financial aid
Communications in South Korea
Government agencies of South Korea
Information technology institutes
Scholarships in South Korea
Government agencies established in 1999
1999 establishments in South Korea